Orienteering Australia is the National organisation responsible for the governing, organisation and promotion of orienteering in Australia. It is a  Full Member of the International Orienteering Federation. Orienteering Australia has its own publication The Australian Orienteer.

Governance 
The Council, which governs Orienteering Australia, is made up of representatives from each association. Daily business is handled by  an elected Board of  6-8 directors. Committees and Officers offer specialist advice to both the Council and Board.

Finance 
The Board Director of Finance is Richard Mountstephens. Orienteering Australia is sponsored principally by the Australian Sports Commission. Some sponsorship is also gained from Silva, which  specifically sponsors the   National Orienteering League. Additional sponsorship is received from the Melbourne Bicycle Centre.

Members of the federation 
Orienteering Australia is a federation made up of the 7 associations, with each State or territory of the commonwealth having a federation.

 ACT: Orienteering ACT 
 NSW: Orienteering New South Wales
 QLD: Orienteering Queensland
 SA: Orienteering South Australia 
 TAS: Orienteering Tasmania 
 VIC: Orienteering Victoria 
 WA: Orienteering Western Australia 

For the Northern Territory, the Top End Orienteers (TEO) is the Orienteering Club, affiliated to OSA

History 
Orienteering Australia was founded in 1970, and joined the International Orienteering Federation the same year. Australia participated in the World Orienteering Championships first time in 1972. The 1985 World Championships were held in Bendigo, Australia.

Individual world champion from Australia is Johanna Allston, who won a gold medal in sprint in 2006. She also won the middle distance in the World Games in 2009.

References

External links 
 Orienteering Australia homepage

Australia, Orienteering
Orienteering in Australia
Sports governing bodies in Australia